This was the first edition of the tournament. Andrea Hlaváčková and Galina Voskoboeva won the title beating polish pair Klaudia Jans and Alicja Rosolska 3–6, 6–0, [10–5] in the final.

Seeds

Draw

Draw

References
 Main Draw

Brussels Open - Doubles